John Martin Keith is a former professional American football player who played safety for four seasons for the San Francisco 49ers in the National Football League. He was drafted in the fourth round of the 2000 NFL Draft.

References

1977 births
Living people
People from Newnan, Georgia
Sportspeople from the Atlanta metropolitan area
Players of American football from Georgia (U.S. state)
American football safeties
Furman Paladins football players
San Francisco 49ers players